Pollenia rufifemorata is a species of cluster fly in the family Polleniidae.

Distribution
Spain.

References

Polleniidae
Insects described in 2008
Diptera of Europe